The Wanakena Footbridge was a pedestrian suspension bridge located at Wanakena in St. Lawrence County, New York. It was constructed in 1902 and spanned the Oswegatchie River.  It was originally constructed to provide a crossing for the employees of the Rich Lumber Company to reach the no longer extant mills.

It was listed on the National Register of Historic Places in 1999. In 2014 it was destroyed by an ice jam that floated downstream and collided with the bridge; two years later it was removed from the Register.
In July 2016 a new bridge was dedicated and opened after fund raising by the Wanakena Historical Association and others.

References

Former bridges in the United States
Former National Register of Historic Places in New York (state)
Bridges completed in 1902
Transportation buildings and structures in St. Lawrence County, New York
Pedestrian bridges in New York (state)
Pedestrian bridges on the National Register of Historic Places
Suspension bridges in New York (state)